The Concubine is the debut novel by Nigerian writer Elechi Amadi originally published in 1966 as part of the Heinemann African Writers Series.

Set in a remote village in Eastern Nigeria, an area yet to be affected by European values and where society is orderly and predictable, the story concerns a woman "of great beauty and dignity" who inadvertently brings suffering and death to all her lovers.

The novel portrays a society still ruled by traditional gods, offering a glimpse into the human relationships that such a society creates.

On its publication in London by Heinemann Educational Books, The Concubine was hailed as a "most accomplished first performance" and "an outstanding work of pure fiction". A critical study of the novel was written by Alastair Niven, who called it: "an example of how an absence of conscious sophistication or experimentation can result in a novel of classic simplicity.... Rooted firmly among the hunting and fishing villages of the Niger delta, The Concubine nevertheless possesses the timelessness and universality of a major novel."

The Concubine has been made into a film, written by Elechi Amadi and directed by Nollywood director Andy Amenechi; the film was premiered in Abuja in March 2007.

References 

East African Educational Publishers Ltd of Nairobi
Heinemann Educational Books Ltd of London

Nigerian novels adapted into films
1966 Nigerian novels
Novels set in precolonial Africa
Novels set in Nigeria
Heinemann (publisher) books
African Writers Series
1966 debut novels